Araluen may refer to:

Places in Australia
New South Wales
 Araluen, New South Wales, small town

Northern Territory
 Araluen, Northern Territory, a suburb of Alice Springs
 Araluen Cultural Precinct, Alice Springs, which includes the Araluen Arts Centre
 Electoral division of Araluen, covering Alice Springs CBD, the suburb of Araluen, and some rural areas

Queensland
 Araluen, Queensland

Western Australia
 Araluen Botanic Park
 Araluen Pumpback Dam
 Araluen-Wungong Important Bird Area

Fictional places
 Araluen Kingdom, home of most of the protagonists in the Ranger's Apprentice series of novels.

People
 Evelyn Araluen, Indigenous Australian poet

Other
 Araluen Gum, common name of Eucalyptus kartzoffiana
 Araluen Zieria, common name of Zieria adenophora